Crosses (usually stylized as †††) is the musical side project of Deftones singer Chino Moreno and Far guitarist Shaun Lopez, based in Los Angeles, California, and formed in 2011.

History

Debut EPs and self-titled release (2011–2014)
Having recorded together previously, Deftones singer Chino Moreno began recording with childhood friend and neighbor Shaun Lopez of the band Far, as well as Chuck Doom. Moreno described the project as "minimal and soothing and it's sort of like the stuff I like listening to when I'm not screaming my head off." With a tentative title of Crosses as the name of the project, they began recording for over four hours a day, completing nearly 16 songs with plans to self-release a series of EPs.

Recorded at Airport Studios in Los Angeles, California, their debut EP was released for free on August 2, 2011, with a higher quality version made available for purchase on their website. Duff McKagan, of Velvet Revolver and Loaded, contributed additional bass to the song "This Is a Trick" while Chris Robyn of Far performed live drums on the EP. Dino Campanella of the rock band Dredg has also worked as a live drummer for the band.

Crosses contributed a previously unreleased song titled "The Years" to the Batman: Arkham City – The Album, the soundtrack to the game of the same name. It was also featured in the game's Joker trailer.

A second EP from Crosses was released on January 24, 2012.

In 2012, Crosses played the Lollapalooza Chile festival as well as the Quilmes Rock festival.

Crosses released a vinyl single, including the tracks "Option" and "Telepathy" from their first two EPs, for Record Store Day 2012. The band also released an official remix of the Rob Zombie song, "Dragula", appearing on Zombie's 2012 album Mondo Sex Head.

At the end of 2012, "Telepathy" appeared on the soundtrack for video game Need for Speed: Most Wanted.

A postulated third Crosses EP was not released, and Moreno put Crosses temporarily on hold while he concluded work with Deftones (the album Koi No Yokan, issued in November 2012) and another side project, Palms, with ex-members of Isis (releasing their debut album, Palms, in June 2013).

In September 2013, Crosses signed with Sumerian Records.

In October 2013, Crosses announced that a full-length album was set to be released on November 26, 2013 through Sumerian, and also posted the new track "The Epilogue" online for streaming. The release date for the band's eponymous debut was later pushed back to February 11, 2014, and the new track "Bitches Brew" was posted online for streaming along with the announcement. On November 26, the date Crosses were originally scheduled to release their debut album, the band instead released a music video for "Bitches Brew" directed by Raul Gonzo. The album contains remastered versions of all songs from the previous two EPs as well as five new tracks (essentially, what would have been EP 3). The track order intermingles new tracks and songs from both EPs.

On April 19, 2014, for Record Store Day, Crosses reissued the first two EPS as well as EP 3, all on colored 10-inch vinyl.

In 2014, Crosses appeared as part of the Australian music festival Soundwave, followed by a US spring tour.

New material, Permanent Radiant (2020–present)
On December 24, 2020, Crosses released a cover of Cause and Effect's "The Beginning of the End", marking the first release from the band since 2014. Exactly one year later on December 24, 2021, Crosses released a cover of Q Lazzarus's song "Goodbye Horses". With the release of "Goodbye Horses" came the announcement that Crosses had signed a world-wide record deal with Warner Records with new music arriving in early 2022.

On March 18, 2022, Crosses released a double single called "Initiation/Protection", followed in October by "Day One/Vivien". After the launch of the "Vivien" music video, the duo announced the EP Permanent Radiant that was released on December 9, 2022.

Style
The musical style of Crosses is often referred to as electronic, electronic rock, dark wave or dark pop, dream pop or witch house. However, Carson O'Shoney of Consequence of Sound and Daniel Brockman of The Boston Phoenix note that Crosses only shares a resemblance to witch house in aesthetics and imagery, and not the group's actual music. O'Shoney said that Crosses' witch house influence is "noticeable just by looking at the tracklist—every song has at least one † in it. The name of the band is †††. The name of the EP is †. Everything about the EP points to witch house—until you listen to the actual music." The group's decision to use this imagery stems from Chino Moreno's interest in the art and mystique around religion. Moreno however also said, "I didn't want people to think we are a religious band, a satanic band or that we are a witch-house band. It's difficult using a religious symbol, but at the same time, I think in an artistic way, it can totally go somewhere else and I think we are kind of walking that line."

Discography

Studio albums

Extended plays

Singles

Music videos

Compilation contributions

References

External links
 
 

Musical groups established in 2011
American electronic rock musical groups
Deftones
Rock music groups from California
Electronic music groups from California
Musical groups from Los Angeles
Sumerian Records artists
American musical trios
2011 establishments in California